Quelli della notte was an Italian late night variety show, broadcast on Rai 2 in 1985.

Created and hosted by Renzo Arbore, it lasted 33 episodes. A parody of serious talk shows, it started with an audience of 800,000 people and raised up to 3 million and a 51% share. Its cast included  Nino Frassica, Maurizio Ferrini,  Riccardo Pazzaglia, Marisa Laurito, Roberto D'Agostino, Simona Marchini, Giorgio Bracardi, Massimo Catalano, Gianni Mazza. Andy Luotto, who played an Arabic character, Sheik Harmand, following a protest by the Association of Italian Muslims and some serious threats, was forced to abandon the program after a few episodes.

References

1985 Italian television series debuts
1985 Italian television series endings
Italian television shows
RAI original programming 
1980s Italian television series